Richard M. Christiansen (August 21, 1928 – November 10, 2001) was a member of the Ohio House of Representatives.

References

Democratic Party members of the Ohio House of Representatives
1928 births
2001 deaths
20th-century American politicians